The South Fork Clackamas River is a tributary, roughly  long, of the Clackamas River in the U.S. state of Oregon. Beginning near South Fork Mountain in the western Cascade Range, the river flows generally north through Clackamas County to meet the larger river at Big Cliff. Most of the South Fork's drainage basin lies within the Mount Hood National Forest.

The lower reaches of the river are part of the National Wild and Scenic Rivers System. Recreational opportunities in the basin include hiking, camping, and fishing for trout. A  waterfall prevents salmon and other migratory fish from swimming upriver beyond the first .

Course
Originating near South Fork Mountain in the Cascade Range, the river runs generally north through rugged terrain in the Mount Hood National Forest. At this point the river flows under Forest Road 45, a loop road that follows ridges to the left and right of the South Fork for much of the rest of its course.

Beyond Forest Road 45, the river turns to the northeast. At  from the mouth, it receives the East Fork of the South Fork Clackamas River from the right. Further downstream, Oscar Creek enters from the right, then Memaloose Creek from the right only  from the mouth.

The  of the South Fork Clackamas River between the East Fork of the South Fork and the mainstem Clackamas River were designated "wild" in the National Wild and Scenic Rivers System in 2009. Designated rivers are classified as either wild, scenic, or recreational depending on the degree of access and amount of nearby development.

Watershed
The Clackamas Ranger District of the U.S. Forest Service manages 79 percent of the land, the Bureau of Land Management 18 percent, while private owners control 3 percent. Watersheds bordering the South Fork basin are Fish Creek to the southeast, tributaries of the Molalla River to the southwest, Clear Creek to the northwest, and the Clackamas River to the northeast.

Recreation
A hiking guide calls the river "one of the most remote large streams in the state of Oregon". The Hillockburn Trail, which provides the only access to the lower river corridor, is  round trip. It runs from Forest Road 45 west of the river to a campsite along the stream. Trail uses include hiking, mountain biking, backpacking, and access to catch-and-release fishing for trout. Vegetation along the trail consists mainly of Douglas-firs and Western hemlocks with an understory of salal, sword fern, and Oregon-grape.

A  waterfall  from the mouth prevents fish migration between the upper and lower river. Native winter steelhead, spring Chinook salmon, and Coho salmon frequent the river downstream of the barrier falls but are off-limits to anglers.

See also
List of rivers of Oregon

References

Works cited
Lorain, Douglas (2008. Afoot and Afield Portland/Vancouver: A Comprehensive Hiking Guide (2nd ed.). Berkeley, Calif: Wilderness Press. .
United States Forest Service (1997).  "South Fork Clackamas River Watershed Analysis: Final Report". Retrieved February 28, 2010.

External links
Clackamas River Basin Council 
National Wild and Scenic Rivers System

Rivers of Oregon
Rivers of Clackamas County, Oregon